Mount Ascutney is a mountain in the U.S. state of Vermont. At , it is the second-highest peak in Windsor County. (The highest peak in the county is Gillespie Peak in the Joseph Battell Wilderness.) Mount Ascutney is a monadnock that rises abruptly from the surrounding lowlands. Particularly noteworthy are the mountain's granite outcrops, one of which, near the summit, serves as a launching point for hang-gliders.

The mountain's base straddles several villages — Ascutney, Brownsville, Windsor, and West Windsor — and it is located only several miles off exit 8 on Interstate 91 in Mount Ascutney State Park.   The mountain itself is visible from the top of Mount Washington, seventy miles away.

Location and description 
Mt. Ascutney is located in the southeastern section of Windsor County, in the Connecticut River Valley.  The village of Ascutney, in the town of Weathersfield, is to the south.  To the north lie the towns of Windsor and West Windsor.  The village of Brownsville, in the town of West Windsor, sits at the northwestern base of the mountain.  To the east lie the Connecticut River and the city of Claremont, New Hampshire.  To the immediate west stands another, smaller mountain, fittingly named Little Ascutney Mountain.

Etymology and naming dispute 
Since the Colonial era, the mountain has primarily been referred to as "Mount Ascutney" (or such variant spellings as "Aschutney"), a name made official by the U.S. Board on Geologic Names in 1960. While various folk etymologies exist, many modern sources trace the name "Ascutney" to the Abenaki word Ascutegnik, a word meaning "at the end of the river fork," which was the name of a settlement near where the Sugar River meets the Connecticut River. However, the use of the Abenaki word Kaskadenak (pronounced: Cas-Cad-Nac)–which means "mountain of the rocky summit" or "wide mountain"–as a name of the mountain has long been attested, and the Board on Geologic Names acknowledges the name as an official variant. In 2016, Hartland resident Robert Hutchins petitioned the Board to change the official name to Kaskadenak, garnering the support of Chief Paul Bunnell of the Koasek Traditional Band of the Abenaki Nation among others. In July 2018, the State of Vermont Board of Libraries, which has the statutory authority to name geographical features, heard arguments to officially rename the mountain to Mount Kaskadenak. The Board of Libraries voted 5–0 to reject the name change, citing the testimony of town managers who reported local opposition at meetings on the name change and the results of polling. The Board also cited an email from Smithsonian linguist Ives Goddard, who proposed that the origin of the name "Ascutney" was the Abenaki word kskatena and wrote that"Ascutney […] and Cascadnac (from Western Abenaki kaskadenak) are both authentic names meaning 'wide mountain.' Both names reflect variable features of the local Native American language and of English from different times."

Viewing the mountain 
Vermont Route 131 follows the south face of the mountain, and provides some good views of Ascutney. Similarly, Vermont Routes 44 and 44-A follow the north face, and provide a number of views of that side of the mountain. The north-south route of Interstate 91 runs just east of the mountain and provides extensive views of both the north and south faces.  New Hampshire Routes 12 and 12-A provide good views of the east face.  Viewing of the west face is difficult, due to the presence, immediately to the west, of Little Ascutney Mountain.

At longer distance, the mountain is visible from many locations quite a few miles away, particularly hilltops and other mountains. Ascutney can be viewed from select locations on the Dartmouth College campus, among them the upper floors of Rauner Library and the Steele Chemistry Building.

Cornish Colony 
From the late 1880s to 1930, a community of artists thrived in Cornish and Plainfield, New Hampshire as well as Windsor, Vermont. Besides Augustus Saint-Gaudens, other artists built their homes specifically sited towards the mountain, and it became the focal point of many expansive gardens and Italianate villas. Maxfield Parrish, Charles Platt, Thomas Dewing, and Winston Churchill (the writer) all built homes to view the mountain. Many of these houses remain, view intact, and the estate Augustus Saint Gaudens is now a national park, with, of course, a lovely view.

Geology 
Mount Ascutney is part of the White Mountain plutonic-volcanic series of igneous rocks. These rocks intruded from Triassic to Cretaceous time in southern Maine, New Hampshire, and Vermont with the relatively young Ascutney pluton intruding at ~122 MA (K/Ar date on biotite). The Ascutney pluton is about 8 km × 4 km in map area and intrudes into Precambrian basement gneisses of the Chester dome and overlying Paleozoic metasedimentary rocks. The pluton emplacement is probably related to the formation of transform faults and/or fracture zones during (failed) Mesozoic rifting. The petrology of the pluton consists of three stocks which are gabbro-diorite, syenite and granite. There are also a partial ring dike and a number of other dikes in the area.

The last glacier broke material off the mountain and distributed it southward into Massachusetts. The trail it left is known as the "Mount Ascutney Train."

Hang gliding 
Mount Ascutney is a hang gliding site in New England. Notable for its excellent soaring, it is not unusual for hang gliders to fly from Mt. Ascutney to nearby states. Some trips can stretch to the New Hampshire or Massachusetts coastline, a flight of over 90 miles.

Bronson Farm
Actor Charles Bronson owned a farm near the mountain he and his wife named Zuleika, after their daughter.  His remains were buried at Brownsville Cemetery in West Windsor, near the foot of the mountain, after his 2003 death.

Wildlife 
Wild turkeys, deer, porcupines, and a wide variety of birds are commonly seen on Mt. Ascutney.  The mountain is a favorite area for viewing migrating birds, which use the Connecticut River as a navigation pathway.  More rarely seen wildlife includes moose, black bears, bobcats and fishers.

Hiking trails 
The mountain features four principal hiking trails, three of which are named for the town from which that trail originates:

 The Weathersfield Trail — The one trail on the south face of the mountain, the base of this trail is located in a parking lot at the end of Cascade Falls Rd, off of Vermont Route 131 in Weathersfield.  Highlights of this trail include Cascade Falls, the largest waterfall on the mountain, and the mountain's one launch platform for hang gliders.
 The Windsor Trail – This trail originates from a small parking area off Vermont Route 44-A just east of the junction with Vermont Route 44.  About 1/3 of the way up, the trail comes to a small waterfall, approximately 2/3 of the way up the trail comes to a small log lean-to shelter.  Near the top, it merges with the Brownsville Trail.
 The Brownsville Trail – This trail begins at a parking area along Vermont Route 44, a little over a mile west of junction with Vermont Route 44-A.  The lower end of the trail follows an abandoned logging road for some distance – the road terminating at the location of an old granite quarry.  The trail offers many good viewing opportunities to the north and west.
 The Futures Trail – This trail begins in the campground at Mt. Ascutney State Park on Route 44A, one mile west of the junction with U.S. Route 5 in Ascutney.  This is the longest trail on Mt. Ascutney – 4.6 miles, covering a wide variety of forest and geography before it connects to the Windsor Trail near the summit.  Highlights of this trail include Bare Rock Vista (1.0 mile) and the Steam Donkey – a steam powered machine used for cable logging in the early 1900s (3.5 miles).  This trail can also be accessed at two points along the State Park Mountain Road for a shorter hike to summit.

At the top, a relatively level trail follows the ridgeline and crosses the summit.  The top of the mountain is well below the tree line and is therefore covered in forest. There are a number of rocky cliffs allow good viewing, one lookout in particular The Nowlan Lookout is named for a local American sculptor Lawrence Nowlan. There is an observation tower, as well.  There are also two large communications towers.

The summit can also be reached via a short trail from the parking lot at the end of the only road up the mountain, the Mt. Ascutney State Park Mountain Road.

Skiing and the Ascutney Mountain Resort 

Mt. Ascutney was home to the Ascutney Mountain Resort, which was a ski resort located on the mountain's northwest face, in the village of Brownsville. The ski area closed in 2010, and is now a nature preserve with plans to reopen a smaller ski area. Opening after the end of World War II, skiing facilities originally consisted of just one rope tow.  The resort property was purchased by IHG Resorts in 2008 andcontinues to renovate and improve the property.  The mountain and trails were purchased by a non-profit organization Vermont Outdoors and is now operated as town forest for Brownsville Vermont.  The trails accommodate the entire family, but expert and intermediate skiers found themselves most at home at the resort, whose trails averaged from medium grade to steep, and were often icy from the mountain's often harsh winds.  The ski resort's primary competitors were Killington, Okemo, Mount Sunapee, and Stratton.

See also 
 List of mountains in Vermont
 List of New England Fifty Finest

References

External links
 Windsor Mt. Ascutney Region Chamber of Commerce

Mountains of Vermont
Brownsville, Vermont
Weathersfield, Vermont
West Windsor, Vermont
Windsor, Vermont
Inselbergs of North America
Mountains of Windsor County, Vermont
Protected areas of Windsor County, Vermont
Vermont placenames of Native American origin